Danaus melanippus, the black veined tiger, white tiger, common tiger, or eastern common tiger, is a butterfly species found in tropical Asia which belongs to the "crows and tigers", that is, the danaine group of the brush-footed butterflies family.

It ranges from Assam in eastern India through South-East Asia south to Indonesia, and eastwards to the Philippines and through southern China to Taiwan. It has around 17 subspecies, and its closest relative is the Malay tiger, Danaus affinis.

Gallery

Subspecies
Listed alphabetically:
D. m. celebensis (Staudinger, 1889) – northern Sulawesi
D. m. edmondii (Bougainville, 1837) – Philippines
D. m. edwardi (van Eecke, 1914) – Simeulue
D. m. eurydice (Butler, 1884) – Nias
D. m. haruhasa Doherty, 1891 – Sumbawa - Alor
D. m. hegesippus (Cramer, [1777]) – Peninsular Malaya, Langkawi, Singapore, Sumatra, Bangka, Belitung
D. m. indicus (Fruhstorfer, 1899) – eastern India - Thailand, Indo-China
D. m. keteus (Hagen, 1898) – Mentawai
D. m. kotoshonis Matsumura, 1929 – Taiwan
D. m. lotina (Fruhstorfer, 1904) – Natuna Island
D. m. lotis (Cramer, [1779])
D. m. melanippus (Cramer, [1777]) – Java
D. m. meridionigra Martin, [1914] – central Sulawesi
D. m. nesippus (Felder, 1862) – Nicobars
D. m. pietersi (Doherty, 1891) – Enggano
D. m. umbrosus Fruhstorfer, 1906 – Pualu Tello

See also
List of butterflies of India
List of butterflies of India (Nymphalidae)

References

External links

Danaus (butterfly)
Butterflies of Asia
Butterflies of Singapore
Butterflies of Indochina
Butterflies described in 1777
Taxa named by Pieter Cramer